Endori (also known as Endouri) is a big village in Bhind district, Madhya Pradesh, India. Khaneta, Sherpur and Chandokharand are nearby villages.

External links
 Census villages in Endori

Villages in Bhind district